Bade Ghar Ki Beti is a 1989 Indian Hindi-language drama film directed by Kalpataru. It stars Meenakshi Seshadri and Rishi Kapoor in pivotal roles.

Plot
Mala is the daughter of Kishanlal who works as a servant with a wealthy family. One day Mala meets with the owner of this family, who is so impressed with Mala that he asks for her hand in marriage for his fourth son, Gopal, which Kishanlal humbly accepts. As a result, Mala marries Gopal, and moves in to their palatial home. While Mala is helpful and sweet-natured, the rest of the daughter-in-laws, three of them, are quite the opposite. When bad times befall this family, the owner passes away; Gopal and Mala move out, leaving Gopal's mother at the mercy of her indifferent sons, Girdhar, Murli, Manohar, and their abusive wives who refuse to assist in any household work, virtually forcing their aged mother-in-law to all menial work, not looking after her needs, even when she becomes ill, and ultimately throwing her out of the house. Gopal gains popularity as a musician, while his brothers mortgage their family home with a moneylender. They decide to live off Gopal, and tell him that their mother has gone for a tirath-yatra (holy journey). With that out of the way, the brothers go back to their lifestyle, unconcerned their mother may be destitute, ill, and on the verge of dying.

Cast

 Meenakshi Seshadri as Mala
 Rishi Kapoor as Gopal
 Shammi Kapoor as Thakur Din Dayal 
 Sushma Seth as Lakshmi Din Dayal
 Raj Kiran as Manohar
 Satish Shah as Murli
 Aruna Irani as Murli's wife
 Gulshan Grover as Girdhar
 Ashok Saraf as Kasturi
 Urmila Matondkar as Pushpa
 Kader Khan as Munim Ji
Shivram as Kishanlal, Mala Father
Urmila Bhatt as Kishanlal Wife   Mala's Mother 
Paintal

Soundtrack
Music is composed by Laxmikant–Pyarelal, while the songs are written by Santosh Anand and Hasan Kamal.

References

External links

1980s Hindi-language films
1989 films
Films directed by Kalpataru
Indian drama films